This article lists the oldest buildings in the state of Connecticut in the United States of America. The dates of construction are based on land tax and probate records, architectural studies, genealogy, radio carbon dating and dendrochronology. Buildings on the list should be limited to the First Period of American architecture (before 1725).

Notes

Oldest
Connecticut